The 2003 Southend-on-Sea Council election took place on 1 May 2003 to elect members of Southend-on-Sea Unitary Council in Essex, England. One third of the council was up for election and the Conservative party stayed in overall control of the council.

After the election, the composition of the council was
Conservative 32
Labour 10
Liberal Democrat 8
Independent 1

Election result
The results saw the Conservatives keep control of the council with a slightly reduced majority of 13 seats. The only changes saw the Conservatives lose one seat to the Liberal Democrats in St Laurence ward and an independent candidate gain Westborough from the Labour party.

Ward results

References

2003
2003 English local elections
2000s in Essex